Peisander or Pisander of Laranda (Peísandros ho Larandinós) was a Greek poet who flourished during the reign of Alexander Severus (222–235 AD). He wrote a sixty-book epic called the Heroikai Theogamiai ("Heroic Marriages of the Gods") which, like the poetry of his father Nestor of Laranda, appears to have influenced Nonnus' Dionysiaca. Peisander's poem, of which only small fragments survive as quotations in other authors, amounted to "a comprehensive epic on world history". Among the extant fragments, there is mention of Io, Cadmus and the Argonauts, but the most significant fragment is the testimony of Macrobius that states that Peisander's history of the world began from the marriage of Zeus and Hera.

Notes

Bibliography
 .
 .
 .
 .
 .
 .

3rd-century Greek writers
Ancient Roman poets
3rd-century poets
Ancient Greek epic poets
People from Karaman
Lycaonia
Year of birth missing
Year of death missing